This is an alphabetical list of films produced or filmed in Guinea.

A
Allah Tantou (1991).

B
Ballon d'or, Le (1994)
Be kunko (2005) 
Blanc d'ébène (1992)
Bongo's Jinx (1986)

C
Chemin du combattant, Le (1983) 
Choisis-toi un ami... (1996) 
Cafard, le (1981)

D
Dakan (1997) 
Denko (1993)
David Achkar, Une Étoile filante (1998)

E
Enfant noir, L (1994)

F
Fleuve, Le (2003) 
Funérailles de Kwame Nkrumah, Les (1972)

G
God's Will (1989)

H
Hafia, triple champion d'Afrique (1978) 
Huit et vingt (1967) 
Hyrde diama (1971)

I
I.T. - Immatriculation temporaire (2001)
Il va pleuvoir sur Conakry (2007)

K
Konorofili (ou anxiété) (2000)

L

M

Mathias, le procès des gangs (1997)

N
Naitou l'orpheline (1982)
1993 Nuit blanche (1993)

O
Ouloukoro (1983) 
Onzième Commandement, long-métrage, Le (1998)
Oriental, L' (1982)
Opus 1, (1985)

P
Paris selon Moussa (2003)

Q

R 

 Ragazzi (1991)

S 

Sergent Bakary Woolen, Le (1966)
Sourire du serpent, le (2007)

T

 Trace de Kandia, le (2015)

U
Un matin bonne heure (2006)

V

W 

 Waps, (1988)

X

Y

Z

References 

Guinea
Guinea
Films